Futsal at the 2007 Pan American Games took place at the Rio Centro Complex in a temporary facility. It was the first time the sport was played in a Pan American Games, mainly because Brazil hosted the games, and it is very popular there.

In each group, each team played against all others once and the two best teams in each group advanced to the semifinals. The teams that did not advance to the semi-finals played 5th to 8th classification matches.

Preliminary round

Group A

Group B

Consolation round

Classification 5th-8th

Seventh Place

Fifth Place

Final round

Semifinals

Bronze Medal

Gold Medal

Final classification

2007
Events at the 2007 Pan American Games
2007